Bernd Posselt (born 4 June 1956) is a German politician, who served as a Member of the European Parliament from 1994 to 2014, representing the Christian Social Union in Bavaria (CSU) and the European People's Party (EPP). He is currently a member of the executive board of the CSU.

Personal and professional background

Posselt was born in Pforzheim, Baden-Württemberg as a son of expellees. He was a Member of the European Parliament from 1994 to 2014. In 1998 he became president of the Paneuropa-Union Deutschland, the German branch of the International Paneuropean Union.

Political and community activities

Posselt is the leading German advocate of the rights of those Germans whose ancestors lived in the Sudetenland area of Bohemia as well as Moravia and who were expelled by the Potsdam conference and the governments in Central and Eastern Europe after the Second World War. His main goal - and the principal aim of the Sudetendeutsche Landsmannschaft that he has led since 2000 - is to revoke the so-called Beneš decrees, as well as other acts of the post-war expulsions that were meant to punish the German population in the Sudetenland as a whole for its prevailing support of Nazism.

Posselt is respected in the Sudeten German community and in his home state of Bavaria. The conservative Bavarian government has often supported the Sudeten German community, and was among those demanding that the Czech Republic should repeal the Beneš decrees before being allowed into European Union.

References

External links

 Official website

1956 births
Living people
Politicians from Munich
MEPs for Germany 2004–2009
Christian Social Union in Bavaria MEPs
MEPs for Germany 1999–2004
MEPs for Germany 2009–2014
Recipients of the Cross of the Order of Merit of the Federal Republic of Germany